It's a Blue World may refer to:

 It's a Blue World (Mel Tormé album), 1955
 It's a Blue World (Red Garland album), 1970
 "It's a Blue World" (song), a 1940 song by Chet Forrest and Bob Wright

See also
 Blue world (disambiguation)